Paul Dawson (born September 16, 1985) is a lacrosse player who plays defense for the Rochester Knighthawks. His older brother Dan, plays for the Toronto Rock.

Dawson was drafted as a goaltender in the first round (7th overall) in the 2006 National Lacrosse League entry draft.  As a goaltender, Dawson played with the Brampton Excelsiors in the Senior A Major Series Lacrosse League.  The San Jose Stealth converted him from a goaltender to a defenseman starting with the 2008 NLL season. He was then traded to the Boston Blazers, where he played two seasons with his brother Dan.

In 2010, Dawson was traded to the Calgary Roughnecks, who subsequently traded him to the Philadelphia Wings,. A year later, Dawson was reunited with his brother when Dan Dawson was acquired in the Boston Blazers dispersal draft. Both Dawsons played one season in Philadelphia before being traded together to the Rochester Knighthawks for a package of four players including Paul Rabil.

References

1985 births
Living people
Boston Blazers players
Canadian lacrosse players
Lacrosse people from Ontario
Philadelphia Wings players
Rochester Knighthawks players
San Jose Stealth players
Sportspeople from Oakville, Ontario